St Garmon's Church may refer to one of several churches in Wales dedicated to Saint Germanus of Auxerre. The Welsh place name, Llanarmon, means "church of Saint Garmon".

St Garmon's Church, Abersoch
St Garmon's Church, Betws Garmon
St Garmon's Church, Capel Garmon
St Garmon's Church, Castle Caereinion
St Garmon's Church, Llanarmon Dyffryn Ceiriog
St Garmon's Church, Llanarmon Mynydd Mawr
St Garmon's Church, Llanarmon-yn-Iâl
St Garmon's Church, Llanfechain
St Garmon's Church, St Harmon

See also
 St German's Church, Cardiff